Hatta may refer to:

Places
 Hatta, Gaza, a Palestinian Arab village depopulated in 1948
 Hatta, Madhya Pradesh, a village in Damoh District, Madhya Pradesh, India
 Hatta, United Arab Emirates, a mountain town in the United Arab Emirates
 Hatta Fort Hotel in the United Arab Emirates
 Hatta Station in Nagoya, Japan
 Kintetsu Hatta Station on the Kintetsu Nagoya Line in Japan
 Ise-Hatta Station in Mie, Japan
 Kukkar Hatta, a town in Pakistan

Given name
Hatta Rajasa (born 1953), Indonesian politician

Surname
 Hamis Hatta, Timorese politician 
 Ichiro Hatta (1906–1983), Japanese wrestler and politician
 Jaslee Hatta, Singapore football player 
 Janet Hatta (born 1953), actress in Japan
 Kayo Hatta (1958–2005), Asian American filmmaker, writer, and community activist
 Madd Hatta, the owner of Paid in Full Entertainment
 Mohammad Hatta (1902–1980), Indonesian independence leader and first Vice President
 Naoki Hatta (born 1986), Japanese football player
 Shinya Hatta (born 1984), Japanese football player
 Tomohiro Hatta (born 1986), Japanese piano player
 Uichiro Hatta, Japanese football player
 Yoichi Hatta, Japanese engineer

Other
 the Hatta number, a dimensionless parameter in chemical reaction engineering
 Hatta Club, a sports club based in Dubai
 Hatta, another name for the Keffiyeh
 The Hatter, a character in Through the Looking-Glass, by Lewis Carroll